The Jacksonville Bulls were a professional American football team based in Jacksonville, Florida. They were members of the United States Football League (USFL) during its final two seasons, 1984 and 1985. They played their home games in the Gator Bowl in Jacksonville.

Former Miami Dolphins stars Larry Csonka and Jim Kiick were involved in an advertising campaign for the team, and they apparently had a minor ownership interest as well. Larry Munson was hired as radio play-by-play announcer. His distinctive voice was already well known in the Jacksonville area due to his long association with both the University of Georgia Bulldogs and the National Football League's Atlanta Falcons.

Team name and colors
The Bulls' name was taken from team owner Fred "Bubba" Bullard, a Jacksonville land developer. Bullard had initially sought to buy a stake in the Boston Breakers and move them to Jacksonville when it became apparent the Breakers could not find a suitable venue in Boston. However, Breakers owner George Matthews broke off talks when Bullard insisted that coach Dick Coury be fired in favor of Florida State Seminoles coach Bobby Bowden.

The team held a 'name the team' promotion with a write-in campaign for publicity purposes. The Bulls moniker was credited as a submission from the winning entry.  The team colors of garnet, orange and silver were taken from the three college football teams most popular in the area; garnet from the Seminoles, orange from the Florida Gators, and silver from the pants worn by the Georgia Bulldogs.

The helmet design was unique for a professional football team. Each side had the team's logo of a streaking bull (one side the mirror image of the other); the two logos were bridged by a series of parallel lines, and the team name was incorporated into the bridge as a silhouette against the parallel lines.

1984 season
The Bulls made an immediate splash in their first game, in which they blew out the Washington Federals 53-14. Although they finished 6-12 — last in the tough Southern Division — they were far more competitive than their record indicated. Six of their losses were by a touchdown or less, including two losses by a last-second field goal. They remained in contention for most of the season, but a six-game losing streak toward the end of the season kept them out of the playoffs.

The Bulls were an undisputed success at the gate, running away with the league's attendance title. They notched the only two crowds of 70,000 or greater in league history, including a throng of 73,227 against the powerful New Jersey Generals on March 4. In the last game, against the Pittsburgh Maulers, a huge crowd patiently waited through a late-June downpour which postponed the game for more than an hour. When play finally started the Bulls won 26-2.

1984 schedule and results

Sources

1984 roster

1. Danny Miller (K)

2. Rich Hendley (P)

3. Brian Franco (K/P)

5. Jeff Brockhaus (K)

8. Jeff Pierce (P)

9. Ken Hobart (QB)

14. Ben Bennett (QB)

14. Ron Rice (P)

15. Robbie Mahfouz (QB)

16. Buck Belue (QB)

17. Matt Robinson (QB)

20. Billy Cesare (SS)

21. Willie McClendon (RB)

22. Kevin Gray (CB)

23. Kerry Baird (CB)

23. Donald Dykes (CB)

24. Marvin Lewis (FB)

25. Charlie Dean (CB)

26. Chester Gee (CB)

27. Michael Whiting (RB)

28. Matt Courtney (CB)

32. Larry Mason (RB)

33. Vaughan Johnson (LB)

35. John Lott (FS)

44. Larry Key (RB)

44. Bobby Hosea (FS)

45. Mike Goedeker (LB)

46. Don Bessillieu (FS)

47. Sammy Brown (SS)

50. John McLean (LB)

51. Dave Otey (C)

52. Tom Dinkel (LB)

53. Fernando Jackson (LB)

55. Carl Qualls (LB)

55. Dann Lute (LB)

56. Rufus Norman (LB)

56. Doug West (LB)

57. Greg Zappala (LB)

58. Andy Hendel (LB)

59. Russ Washington (LB)

60. Gary Anderson (G/C)

63. Nat Hudson (T)

64. Kenny Howell (G)

65. Wally Pesuit (C)

66. George Collins (G)

67. Warren Gray (G)

69. Rush Brown (DE)

70. Val Brown (DE)

72. Don Latimer (NT)

73. Ed Gantner (DT)

75. Bob Gruber (T)

77. Chris Wampler (NT)

78. Brian Douglas (NT)

80. Gary Clark (WR)

82. Wyatt Henderson (WR)

83. Aubrey Matthews (WR)

84. Paul Bergmann (TE)

85. Perry Kemp (WR)

87. Chuck McCurley (WR)

88. Robert Young (TE)

89. Alton Alexis (WR)

91. Phil Dokes (DE)

92. George Atiyeh (NT)

92. Marvin Dyett (DE)

95. Mike Raines (DE)

97. Charles Philyaw (DE)

98. Bob Clasby (DE)

99. Joe Costello (DE)

--. Amos Lawrence (RB)

--. Dan Gooch (LB)

Charles R. Hunsicker Jr. – Team Chaplain

Offseason
The offseason saw the addition of former NFL MVP QB Brian Sipe to take over as triggerman of Coach Lindy Infante's high octane passing scheme as well as former Heisman Trophy winning HB Mike Rozier.

1985 season
While Sipe only threw 89 passes before suffering a career-ending injury, an improved defense and the addition of Rozier resulted in a 9-9 record. The Bulls finished one win short of a playoff spot and led the league in attendance again.

1985 schedule and results 

Sources

Demise
The Bulls were one of the seven teams assured of playing the 1986 USFL season, which would have been played in the autumn. The Bulls had bought the football assets of the Denver Gold during the offseason and were to take on much of that team's staff, including head coach Mouse Davis. It also attempted to negotiate a merger with the Tampa Bay Bandits, mainly to bring the Bandits' ownership group into the organization, but the eventual deaths of the two leading investors in the Bandits (and their steadfast refusal to go along with the league's plan to move to the autumn in 1986) and the unwillingness of the Orlando Renegades to join in (which would have created a single franchise representing all of Florida) led to those plans being abandoned.

The USFL itself was pursuing a large antitrust lawsuit against the NFL at the time; when they failed to secure a sizable judgment against the older league, the USFL suspended operations and eventually folded.

Legacy
Despite never posting a winning record, the Bulls were considered to be a serious attempt at a viable professional football organization — indeed, one of the few USFL teams with the potential to be viable had the league been better run. Owner Fred Bullard was determined from the beginning to put together a strong organization on and off the field. Many experts believe that had it not been for the Bulls' success, the NFL would not have  considered awarding the Jacksonville Jaguars to the city in 1995.  In 1987 the Houston Oilers nearly moved to Jacksonville, in part due to the overwhelming support for the Bulls. The nearby Matthews Bridge was painted in the garnet main color as a backdrop for the games.

Season-by-season results

|-
|1984 || 6 || 12 || 0 || 5th EC Southern || --
|-
|1985 || 9 || 9 || 0 || 6th EC || --
|-
!Totals || 15 || 21 || 0
|colspan="2"|

References

External links
 USFL.info - Jacksonville Bulls
 http://www.remembertheusfl.8m.com/teams/jacksonville.html

 
1983 establishments in Florida
1986 disestablishments in Florida